Oyee is a 2016 Indian Tamil-language film directed by Francis Markus. The film stars Geethan Britto and Eesha Rebba in lead roles; Nagineedu, Sangili Murugan, Arjunan Nandakumar, and Papri Ghosh play supporting roles. The Oyee soundtrack album and background score were composed by Isaignani Ilayaraaja.  Audio was launched by Kamal Haasan on 22 January 2016.

Plot
The movie is based on 2004 South Korean romantic comedy Too Beautiful to Lie.

Cast 
 Geethan Britto as Krish
 Eesha Rebba as Swetha
 Papri Ghosh as Gayathri
 Arjunan as Krish's uncle
 Nandha Saravanan 
 Sangili Murugan as Krish's grandfather
 Nagineedu as Krish's father
 Tamil Selvi as Krish's mother
 Karate Raja as Coach
 Neelima Rani as Swetha's sister
 Varsha Kumar as Krish's sister
Nandha Saravanan as lead Antagonist

Production
Reports emerged in March 2015 that Geethan Britto and Eesha Rebba would come together for a project titled oyee which would be based on Drama which formed the script of Francis Markus, while Himself would direct it. The team signed up Isaignani Ilayaraaja to compose the film's music.

The film was shot extensively in Pollachi, some portions in Chennai. The film is releasing in theaters on 08.04.2016.

Soundtrack

Track listing

References

External links
 

2016 films
2010s Tamil-language films
Films scored by Ilaiyaraaja